"It's Amazing" is a song by Welsh singer Jem, released as the first single from her second album Down to Earth on 3 June 2008 in the United States and on 2 February 2009 in Europe. The song was featured in the 2008 film Sex and the City and on the official soundtrack. It was also used in episodes 89 and 90 (season 5, 2009) of the television series Medium and in the episode "By Accident" (season 1) of 90210.

Track listing

US single
 "It's Amazing" (album version) – 4:00

European single
 "It's Amazing" (radio edit) – 3:30
 "It's Amazing" (album version) – 4:00

Charts

References

External links
 

2008 singles
2008 songs
2009 singles
ATO Records singles
Jem (singer) songs
Song recordings produced by Lester Mendez
Songs written by Jem (singer)
Songs written by Lester Mendez